Kōhachirō Miyata (born 1938) 宮田 耕八朗 is a shakuhachi flautist and composer. He performs both traditional and contemporary music. He recorded with Ensemble Nipponia in the United States in 1976. Among his students were Clive Bell, Fukuda Teruhisa, Larry Tyrrell, and Rodrigo Rodriguez. His recordings have been published by Nonesuch Records, JVC, and King Records.

Discography

 Shakuhachi: The Japanese Flute. Explorer Series. Electra Nonesuch 1977.

External links

References

1938 births
Japanese composers
Japanese male composers
Living people
Shakuhachi players